Matthew Joseph Dallas (born October 21, 1982) is an American actor, best known for playing the title character on the ABC Family series Kyle XY.

Early life
Dallas was born in Phoenix, Arizona, and attended Arizona School for the Arts. He has two younger brothers and one younger sister. He became interested in acting at the age of 12, when his grandmother took him to a production of the play The Ugly Duckling at a local community theater called Desert Stages Theater.

Career
Dallas has starred in several films, and has played the title character in the ABC Family television series Kyle XY for three seasons. The series ended on March 16, 2009 after it was canceled by ABC. Dallas also appeared in Camp Slaughter (2005), Living The Dream (2006), and Babysitter Wanted (2008). He has been a guest on the TV show Entourage.

In 2004, Dallas starred in Fan_3's music video for Geek Love. In 2005, Dallas starred with Mischa Barton in James Blunt's music video for Goodbye My Lover and in 2008 he starred in Katy Perry's music video for "Thinking of You".

Dallas was cast in ABC's Eastwick, playing Roxie's (Rebecca Romijn) love interest. In 2009, it was announced that Dallas would be appearing in the movie Beauty and the Briefcase with Hilary Duff. Dallas was in an indie western film called The First Ride of Wyatt Earp as Bat Masterson, which was released on March 6, 2012.

In 2012, Dallas starred as Max in the musical love story movie You, Me, & the Circus. He played the role of Bat Masterson in an action packed western movie Wyatt Earp's Revenge with Val Kilmer. He also starred as Lance Leigh in the Hallmark movie Naughty or Nice with Hilarie Burton. Dallas played the role of Scott Orenhauser in the indie sci-fi thriller film Life Tracker. Dallas had a recurring role in ABC Family show Baby Daddy, where he played Riley's (Chelsea Kane) love interest.

In 2014, Dallas starred in the horror comedy movie Ghost of Goodnight Lane. In 2015, Dallas starred as Jake in the web series Anne & Jake. The series was released on YouTube on November 11, 2015. In 2017, Dallas starred as Declan in the drama film Alaska is a Drag, written and directed by Shaz Bennett. He also starred as Frank Dean in the western film Painted Woman directed by James Cotten.

In 2018, Dallas starred as pastor John in supernatural horror film Along Came the Devil. In 2019, Dallas played the role of Greg Carlyle in the Lifetime thriller film A Daughter's Plan to Kill alongside Claire Coffee. He also co-starred as Bobby Browning in the romantic comedy Nearly Married starring Cassi Thomson.

Personal life
Dallas is gay; although, he previously denied this. He denied allegations of being gay for several years after being outed by Perez Hilton on his gossip website, and on the Howard Stern Show. After Perez Hilton publicly announced Dallas was gay on Stern's SiriusXM show, Dallas appeared two weeks later to deny the allegation during which he claimed to have slept with 20 women in high school, and listed a few women in Hollywood to whom he was the most sexually attracted. On July 5, 2015, he married male musician Blue Hamilton. On December 22, 2015, Dallas and Hamilton announced on their YouTube channel that they had adopted a then two year-old, their son Crow. On July 16, 2022 via YouTube, the pair announced they had adopted their second child, Rosa.

Filmography

Films

Television

Music videos

References

External links

 

1982 births
Living people
21st-century American male actors
Male actors from Phoenix, Arizona
American male film actors
American male television actors
American gay actors
LGBT people from Arizona